The persecution of Zoroastrians has been recorded throughout the history of Zoroastrianism, an Iranian religion. The notably large-scale persecution of Zoroastrians began after the rise of Islam in the 7th century CE; both during and after the conquest of Persia by Arab Muslims, discrimination and harassment against Zoroastrians took place in the form of forced conversions and sparse violence. Muslims who arrived in the region after its annexation by the Rashidun Caliphate are recorded to have destroyed Zoroastrian temples, and Zoroastrians living in areas that had fallen under Muslim control were required to pay a tax known as jizya.
 
Mosques were built in the place of some destroyed Zoroastrian temples, and many Persian libraries were burned. Gradually, an increasing number of laws were passed by the Rashidun Caliphate which regulated Zoroastrian behaviour and limited their ability to participate in society. Over time, the persecution of Zoroastrians by Muslims became increasingly common and widespread, and the religion consequently began to decline. As the process of Islamization was initiated under Muslim rule, many Zoroastrians fled east from Persia to India, where they were given refuge.

A large number of Zoroastrians converted to Islam to avoid discrimination and the effects of second-class citizenship in the caliphates. Following the conversion of a Zoroastrian subject, their children would be sent to an Islamic school to learn Arabic and study the Quran as well as other religious teachings; this process contributed to the decline of Zoroastrianism. However, under the Samanid Empire, which was composed of Iranians who had converted from Zoroastrianism to Sunni Islam, the Persian language re-emerged significantly and flourished; this period marked the beginning of the Iranian Intermezzo.

Persecution by Muslims

Islamic conquest

Until the Arab invasion and subsequent Muslim conquest, in the mid-7th century Persia (modern-day Iran) was a politically independent state, spanning from Mesopotamia to the Indus River and dominated by a Zoroastrian majority. Zoroastrianism was the official state religion of four pre-Islamic Persian empires, the last being the Sassanian empire that passed a decree solidifying this in 224 CE. The Arab invasion abruptly brought to an end the religious domination of Zoroastrianism in Persia and instituted Islam as the official religion of the state.

Yemen's Zoroastrians who had the jizya imposed on them after being conquered by Muhammad are mentioned by the Islamic historian al-Baladhuri.

After the Muslim conquest of Persia, Zoroastrians were given dhimmi status and subjected to persecutions; discrimination and harassment began in the form of sparse violence. Those paying Jizya were subjected to insults and humiliation by the tax collectors. Zoroastrians who were captured as slaves in wars were given their freedom if they converted to Islam.

Many fire temples, with their four axial arch openings, were usually turned into mosques simply by setting a mihrab (prayer niche) on the place of the arch nearest to qibla (the direction of Mecca). Zoroastrian temples converted into mosques in such a manner could be found in Bukhara, as well as in and near Istakhr and other Persian cities. Urban areas where Arab governors made their quarters were most vulnerable to such religious persecution, great fire temples were turned into mosques, and the citizens were forced to conform or flee. Many libraries were burnt and much cultural heritage was lost.

Gradually there were increased number of laws regulating Zoroastrian behavior, limiting their ability to participate in society, and made life difficult for the Zoroastrians in the hope that they would convert to Islam. Over time, persecution of Zoroastrians became more common and widespread, and the number of believers decreased significantly. Many converted, some superficially, to escape the systematic abuse and discrimination by the law of the land. Others accepted Islam because their employment in industrial and artisan work would, according to Zoroastrian dogma, make them impure as their work involved defiling fire. According to Thomas Walker Arnold, Muslim missionaries did not encounter difficulty in explaining Islamic tenets to Zoroastrians, as there were many similarities between the faiths. According to Arnold, for the Persian, he would meet Ahura Mazda and Ahriman under the names of Allah and Iblis.

Once a Zoroastrian family converted to Islam, the children had to go to Muslim religion school and learn Arabic and the teachings of the Quran and these children lost their Zoroastrian identity. These factors continued to contribute to increasing rates of conversion from Zoroastrianism to Islam. A Persian scholar commented, "Why so many had to die or suffer? Because one side was determined to impose his religion upon the other who could not understand."

However, Sir Thomas Walker Arnold doubts the entire narrative of the forced conversions of the Zoroastrians, citing many examples of tolerance that were shown by the Muslim overlords concluding that "in the face of such facts, it is surely impossible to attribute the decay of Zoroastrianism entirely to violent conversions made by the Muslim conquerors". Arnold suggests that some of the conversions of the former-Zoroastrians were actually sincere citing the similarities between the two religions as a motivation for the conversions. Stepaniants also (like Arnold) declares that some historians have said that some of the conversions to Islam were sincere citing the fact that Islam offered a broader door of brotherhood, unlike the restrictive criteria of Zoroastrianism. Nevertheless, Sir Thomas Arnold does acknowledge that the persecution of Zoroastrians did take place later on. Stepaniants states that many persecutions took place during the reign of the Abbasids, and around that time was when the Parsi exodus took place. But regardless, both Arnold and Stepaniants say that the Islam is not to blamed entirely for the decline of Zoroastrianism. Furthermore, the population of the city of Nishapur, even after the event of conquest (despite conversions to Islam taking place almost immediately) there still remained sizeable Zoroastrian populations, along with the Jews and Nestorian Christians as well. Fred Donner says that the northern were hardly penetrated by the "believers" for a century or the Iranian nobility who reside in that area made terms with the believers winning virtually complete autonomy over the region in return of a tribute-tax or jizyah. Donner also acknowledges that Zoroastrians continued to exist in large numbers even after the rise of Islam in these regions.

642 to 10th century
In the 7th century CE Persia succumbed to the invading Arabs. With the death of Yazdegerd III, who was treacherously slain in 651 after being defeated in battle, the Sassanid line came to an end and the Zoroastrian faith, and Islam took its place as the national religion of Persia.

In the following centuries, Zoroastrians faced much religious discrimination and persecution, harassments, as well as being identified as najis (polluted) and impure to Muslims, making them unfit to live alongside Muslims, and therefore forcing them to evacuate from cities and face major sanctions in all spheres of life. Zoroastrians have been subject to public humiliation through dress regulations, to being labeled as najis and to exclusion in the fields of society, education and work.

Rashidun Caliphs (642–661) 

Under the first four Caliphs, Persia remained predominantly Zoroastrian. Zoroastrians were awarded the status of People of the Book or dhimmi status by the Caliph Umar, although some practices contrary to Islam were prohibited.

When the Persian capital of Ctesiphon in province of Khvârvarân (today known as Iraq) fell to the Muslims during the Islamic conquest of Persia in 637 under the military command of Sa'ad ibn Abi Waqqas during the caliphate of Umar, the palaces and their archives were burned. According to a 17th-century account cited by Georgie Zeidan, the Arab Commander Sa'ad ibn Abi Waqqas wrote to Caliph Umar ibn al-Khattab asking what should be done with the books at Ctesiphon. Umar wrote back: "If the books contradict the Qur'an, they are blasphemous. On the other hand, if they are in agreement, they are not needed, as for us Qur'an is sufficient." Thus, the huge library was destroyed and the books, the product of the generations of Persian scientists and scholars were thrown into fire or the Euphrates. However, it is doubted whether libraries were actually burned or desecrated. Nearly 40,000 captured Persian noblemen were taken as slaves and sold in Arabia. The Arabs called the Persians 'Ajam' meaning foreign. The first voice of protest came from Abu Lu'lu'a Firuz, an enslaved Persian artisan, who assassinated Umar. When the city of Estakhr in the south, a Zoroastrian religious center, put up stiff resistance against the Arab invaders, 40,000 residents were slaughtered or hanged.

The Umayyads (661–750)
The Umayyads who ruled from Syria followed the Rashidun Caliphs. The persecution increased in the 8th century,  during the reign of the late Umayyad Caliphs, whose dynastic predecessors had conquered most of the last Zoroastrian state by 652. Jizya tax was imposed upon Zoroastrians, and the official language of Persia became Arabic instead of the local Persian. In 741, the Umayyads officially decreed that non-Muslims be excluded from governmental positions.

The Iranian Muslims at this time started a new tradition, which made Islam appear as a partly Iranian religion. They pointed out that an Iranian, Salaman-I-Farsi, had a great influence on the prophet Muhammad. They also pointed out the legend that Husayn, the son of the fourth Caliph, had married a Sassanian princess named Shahrbanu (the Lady of the Land), whose son later became the fourth Muslim Imam (and started the Shia branch of Islam). The Iranian Muslims thus believed that Shia Islam was derived from Sassanian Royalty. These two beliefs made it easier for Zoroastrians to convert. An instance of religious oppression is recorded when an Arab governor appointed a commissioner to supervise the destruction of shrines throughout Iran, regardless of treaty obligations. One of the Umayyad Caliphs was quoted saying, "milk the Persians and once their milk dries, suck their blood".

Yazid-ibn-Mohalleb, a general under the Umayyads, was appointed the head of a great army to lead the Mazandaran expedition. On the way to Mazandaran, the general ordered captives to be hanged at the two sides of the road so that the victorious Arab army pass through. The attack on Tabarestan (present-day Mazandaran) failed, but he established his control in Gorgan. By the orders of Yazid-ibn-Mohalleb so many Persians were beheaded in Gorgan that their blood mixed with water would energize the millstone to produce as much as one day meal for him, as he had vowed. The extent of his brutality represented itself by running watermills by people's blood for three days and he fed his army with the bread made from that very bloody flour. But, Tabarestan remained invincible until the majority of Zoroastrians migrated towards India and the rest converted to Islam gradually.

Although the Umayyad's were harsh when it came to defeating their Zoroastrian adversaries, claiming responsibility for many of the atrocities towards the Zoroastrian population during warfare, but they did however offer protection and relative religious tolerance to the Zoroastrians who accepted their authority. Umar II was reported to have said in one of his letters commanding not to "destroy a synagogue or a church or temple of fire worshippers (meaning the Zoroastrians) as long as they have reconciled with and agreed upon with the Muslims". Fred Donner says that Zoroastrians in the northern parts of Iran were hardly penetrated by the "believers" winning virtually complete autonomy in-return for tribute-tax or jizyah. Donner goes on to say that "... Zoroastrians continued to exist in large numbers in northern and western Iran and elsewhere for centuries after the rise of Islam, and indeed, much of the canon of Zoroastrian religious texts was elaborated and written down during the Islamic period...".

The Abbasids (752–804)
The Umayyads were followed by the Abbasid dynasty which came to power with the help of Iranian Muslims. The persecution of Zoroastrians increased significantly under the Abbasids, temples and sacred-fire shrines were destroyed. Also during Abbasid rule, the status of Zoroastrians in Persian lands was reduced from zimmi (or dhimmi, people who were protected by the state and generally considered 'People of the Book') to 'kafirs' (non-believers). As a result, Zoroastrians were not granted the same rights and status as Jews and Christians. Iranian Muslims were welcomed to the court, but not Zoroastrians. Zoroastrians were denied access to bathhouses on the grounds that their bodies were polluted.

Hardly any Zoroastrian family was able to avoid conversion to Islam when employed by the Abbasids. Because of their harshness towards unbelievers, and due to their lavish patronage of Persian Muslims, the Abbasids proved to be deadly foes of Zoroastrianism.
According to Dawlatshah, Abdollah-ibn-Tahir, an Arabicized Persian, and governor of Khorasan for the Abbasid caliphs, banned publication in Persian and by his order all the Zoroastrians were forced to bring their religious books to be thrown in the fire. As a result, many literary works written in Pahlavi script disappeared. During the Abbasid reign the Zoroastrians, for the first time became a minority in Iran.

Nevertheless, there were many cases of toleration during the Abbasid era, particularly under the reign of Al-Mu'tasim who flogged an imam and muezzin for destroying a fire-temple and replacing it with a mosque. Al-Mu'tasim allowed rebuilding and the establishment of Zoroastrian fire temples in many places within the borders of the Abbasid Caliphate. It was reported that there were still a significant strength of strongholds of the Zoroastrian communities in places such as Kerman, Qom, Sistan, Fars and more that were surviving under the Abbasid regime. This is not only attested by European explorers of later times, but also the Muslim historians who were present.

The Saffarids (869–903)
The Abbasids were followed by the Saffarids. Zoroastrians lived under the leadership of their High Priest, since they had no king. In Iraq, the political center of the Sassanian state, Zoroastrian institutions were viewed as appendages of the royal government and family, and suffered much destruction and confiscation. Closely associated with the power structures of the Persian Empire, Zoroastrian clergy quickly declined after it was deprived of the state support.

The Samanids (819–999)
The Samanids were of Zoroastrian theocratic nobility who voluntarily converted to Sunni Islam. During their reign, approximately 300 years after the Arab conquest, fire temples were still found in almost every province of Persia including Khorasan, Kirman, Sijistan and other areas under Samanid control. According to Al-Shahrastani, there were fire-temples even in Baghdad at the time. The historian Al-Masudi, a Baghdad-born Arab, who wrote a comprehensive treatise on history and geography in about 956, records that after the conquest:

He also added Sindh and Sin of the Indian subcontinent (Al-Hind) to the list. This general statement of al Masudi is fully supported by the medieval geographers who make mention of fire temples in most of the Iranian towns.

10th to 20th century

Migration to India

The Zoroastrians moved to India in successive migrations in the Islamic period. The initial migration following the conquest has been characterized as a religious persecution by invading Muslims. According to the account, the Zoroastrians suffered at their hands and in order to protect themselves and safeguard their religion, fled first to northern Iran, then to the island of Hormuz and finally to India. This generally accepted narrative of migration emphasises Muslim persecution while identifying Parsis as religious refugees. Recently, scholars have questioned this explanation of Iranian origins. There is a scarcity of sources about the migration. Historians are forced to rely exclusively on Qissa-i Sanjan written in 1599 by a Parsi Priest and Qissah-ye Zartushtian-e Hindustan written more than 200 years later. This is complicated by the fact that there were already Zoroastrians in India in the Sasanian period. According to the legend, at the beginning of the 10th century a small group of Zoroastrians living around the town of Nyshapour and Fort of Sanjan in the province of (greater) Khorasan, decided that Iran was no longer safe for Zoroastrians and their religion. The refugees accepted the conditions and founded the settlement of Sanjan (Gujarat), which is said to have been named after the city of their origin (Sanjan, near Merv, in present-day Turkmenistan).

Iranian Zoroastrians are known to have been trading with India for centuries before the dates calculated for arrival of Parsis per Qissa-i Sanjan. Ruksana Nanji and Homi Dhalla while discussing archaeological evidence for 'The Landing of Zoroastrians at Sanjan', conclude that the most likely date for the migration at the start of the middle phase of their chronology, namely the early-to-mid-eighth century. Nevertheless, they express their general skepticism about the Qissa-i Sanjan account. Scholar Andre Wink has theorized that Zoroastrian immigrants to India, both before and after the Muslim conquest of Iran, were primarily merchants, since evidence suggests it was only some time after their arrival that religious experts and priests were sent for to join them. He argues that the competition over trade routes with Muslims may also have contributed to their immigration.

Although historically unsubstantiated, the story of how Zoroastrians gained permission to step on the shores of Gujarat continues to be critical to the self-identity of the group. Per the commonly told narrative, the Rajah of Sanjan, summoned them and demanded to know how they would not be a burden on or a threat to the indigenous communities. Replying to their request of practising their religion and till the land, he showed them a jug full of milk, saying Sanjan like it was full. In one version, a dastur added a coin to the milk, saying like the coin, no one would be able to see that they were there but they would enrich the milk nonetheless. In another version, he added sugar instead and claimed that like it, they would sweeten lands of Sanjan. In both of them their settlement is approved by the Rajah who addresses certain conditions for it: they would explain their religion, promise not to proselytise, adopt Gujarati speech and dress, surrender their weapons and only conduct their rituals after nightfall.

One of the dates that can be fixed with certainty is the arrival of Parsees in Navsari when a mobed named Kamdin Zarthost arrived there in 1142 CE to perform religious ceremonies for Zoroastrians settled there.  Traditionally, the Parsee settlers had named it Navsari after Sari in Iran. However this was considered wrong by the Gazetteer of the Bombay Presidency who noted that the town was already shown in Ptolemy's map.

Apart from two accounts of confrontation in the Qissa, Parsi lore presents a smooth integration into the local culture of first their Hindu, and then Muslim neighbors. The community still exists in western India, and it currently contains the largest concentration of Zoroastrians in the world. "Parsi legends regarding their ancestors' migration to India depict a beleaguered band of religious refugees escaping the harsh rule of fanatical Muslim invaders in order to preserve their ancient faith." The epic poem Qissa-i-Sanjan (Story of Sanjan) is an account of the early years of Zoroastrian settlers on the Indian subcontinent. It is only in recent times that Parsis have become aware of the extent of the oppression that their ancestors in Iran had to endure.

The Safavids (1502–1747)
Zoroastrians had difficult time during the Safavid period and faced repeated persecution and forced conversion. Safavid kings sought to compel them to accept Shia Islam, Sunnis too were forced to convert to Shia or were persecuted, imprisoned, exiled, or killed. Zoroastrians were also branded as impure, in addition to being infidels. As earlier in the century, so this period also witnessed sporadic campaigns for the conversion of Armenians and Zoroastrians, focusing blame for economic and other ills on these and other minorities whose involvement in the spice export, for example, was well known.

In the early 16th century the great Safavid king, Shah Abbas I settled a number of Zoroastrians in a suburb of his new capital, Isfahan. The suburb of Isfahan where the Zoroastrians lived was called Gabr-Mahal, Gabristan or Gabrabad, derived from the word Gabr. Europeans who visited his court left accounts of the 'Gabars' or 'Gabrs' (an insulting term used for Zoroastrians by the Muslims), agree on the poverty and simplicity of their lives. Fearing desecration by Muslims, Zoroastrians hid the sacred fires, and conversed in a newly invented dialect called Dari. Later Safavid kings were not as tolerant as Shah Abbas. Muhammad Baqir Majlisi persuaded Sultan Husayn (1688–1728 CE) to decree the forcible conversion of Zoroastrians; those who refused were killed.

The accounts in Mino Khirad, written during the Savafid period, demonstrate that the Zoroastrians were subjected to harassment by the Shi'ite majority, their places of worship were under a constant threat of being destroyed. By 1707, when Le Bruyn visited Isfahan, the Zoroastrians were no longer able practice their religion freely. He notes that the most deprived Zoroastrians had been brought to Isfahan, and had been forced to become Muslim three years earlier. In 1821, Ker Porter visiting Isfahan notes that there were hardly any Zoroastrians left in Isfahan and Gabrabad was in ruins.

Qajar Dynasty (1796–1925)

A Zoroastrian astrologer named Mulla Gushtasp predicted the fall of the Zand dynasty to the Qajar army in Kerman. Because of Gushtasp's forecast, the Zoroastrians of Kerman were spared by the conquering army of Agha Mohammad Khan Qajar. Despite the aforementioned favorable incident, the Zoroastrians during the Qajar dynasty remained in agony and their population continued to decline. Even during the rule of Agha Mohammad Khan, the founder of the dynasty, many Zoroastrians were killed and some were taken as captives to Azerbaijan. Zoroastrians regard the Qajar period as one of their worst.

Many foreign visitors to Iran of the time had commented on their pitiful situation. Traveller A.V.W. Jackson noted that Zoroastrians lived in constant fear of persecution by Muslim extremists and their lives were in danger whenever the fanatical spirit of Islam broke out, such as the one witnessed by him in Yazd. According to Edward Browne, the wall of Zoroastrian houses had to be lower than that of the Muslims and prohibited from marking their houses with distinctive signs. Zoroastrians were forbidden from erecting new houses and repairing old ones.

Various methods were used to proselytize the minorities. According to a law, if any member of family converted to Islam, he/she was entitled to all inheritance. They were forbidden from taking up lucrative occupations. The community was regarded as outcast, impure and untouchable. The Zoroastrians and their food was considered impure and many public places refused to serve them. When they shopped in the bazaar, they were not allowed to touch any food or fruits. They were threatened with forced conversions, beaten up and fleeced, and their religious sanctuaries were regularly desecrated. Harassments and persecution were the norms of daily life. Zoroastrians were often attacked and beaten by Muslims in the streets. The murders of Zoroastrians were not punished. At times, Zoroastrian girls were kidnapped and forcefully converted and married to Muslims and brought to town in fanfare.

Zoroastrians were subjected to public discrimination through dress regulations – not allowed to wear new or white clothes, and compelled by enactments to wear the dull yellow raiment already alluded to as a distinguishing badge. They were not allowed to wear overcoats but were compelled to wear long robes called qaba and cotton geeveh on their feet even in winter. Wearing eyeglasses, long cloak, trousers, hat, boots, socks, winding their turbans tightly and neatly, carrying watches or rings, were all forbidden to Zoroastrians. During the rainy days they were not allowed carry umbrellas or to appear in public, because the water that had run down through their bodies and cloths could pollute the Muslims. Zoroastrian men in Yazd would carry a large shawl that they would place under their feet when visiting a Muslim's home so as to prevent the carpet from being polluted. Forbidden from riding horses and only allowed to ride mules or donkeys, upon facing a Muslim they had to dismount. The general proscription against Zoroastrians' riding horses and donkeys was lifted by Reza Shah in 1923.

On top of all the misery the Zoroastrians had to pay a heavy religious tax known as Jizya. Zoroastrian sources record the method of extracting this as designed to humiliate the dhimmi, the taxed person, who was compelled to stand while the officer receiving the money sat on a high throne. Upon receiving the payment, the officer gave the dhimmi a blow on the neck and drove him roughly away. The public was invited to watch the spectacle. Arab tax collectors would mock Zoroastrians for wearing Kushti and would rip it off, hanging the cord around the necks of the beleaguered faithful. Due to corruption of the tax officials, at times twice and even three times the official figure would be collected, because every intermediary had to receive his share. If the families could not afford paying the Jizya, their children were beaten and even tortured and their religious books were thrown in fire. That is how the term "the bookless" came about. Under the woeful conditions, some had to convert and there were those who declared themselves Muslims, picked up Islamic names, but in secret continued Zoroastrian practices. Today the latter group among the Zoroastrians is known as Jaddid. In response to persecution and segregation policies, the Zoroastrians community became closed, introverted, and static.

Zoroastrian massacres did not cease during the Qajar rule. The last two are recorded at the villages surrounding the city of Boarzjan and Turkabad near Yazd. Today, the village of Maul Seyyed Aul near Borazjan, among the local people is known as "killing site" (Ghatl-Gauh), and Zoroastrian surnames of Turk, Turki, Turkian and Turkabadi reflect lineage to the survivors of Turkabad. In the 1850s, Comte de Gobineau, the French Ambassador to Iran, wrote: "Only 6000 of them are left and just a miracle may save them from extinction. These are the descendants of the people who one day ruled the world."

Due to the extent of oppression, and destitution, many Zoroastrians ventured to the hazardous journey to India. Those who could not afford the voyage aboard the ships, risked their lives by crossing the hostile desert on donkeys or even on foot. In India, they were recognized for Sedreh and Kushti and were sheltered by their Parsi brethren. There, they formed the second major Indian Zoroastrian community known as the Iranis.

Emissaries to Iran
When the news of their plight reached the Parsis, who by this time had become quite prosperous, Parsi funds were set up to help the Iranian Zoroastrians and emissaries were dispatched to Iran. A Parsi philanthropist, Maneckji Limji Hataria, was sent to help them. He found only 7711 Zoroastrians in Kerman, Yazd and Tehran (now the capital of Iran). Using his influence with the British government he managed to get some of the repression against Zoroastrians removed. Jizya was paid by the Zoroastrian minority until 1882, when it was removed by pressure on the Qajar government from the Persian Zoroastrian Amelioration Fund.

The Zoroastrian Trust Funds of Europe (ZTFE), also attempted to alleviate the conditions of their Iranian brethren. Both Dadabhai Naoroji and Mancherjee Bhownagree, as presidents of the ZTFE and Members of Parliament addressed the House of Commons of the United Kingdom on the issue of the persecution of Zoroastrians in Iran. On the six occasions, Shah Naser al-Din Shah Qajar visited London; Parsi delegations from the ZTFE were present to advocate for their Iranian co-religionists suffering the intense persecution of the Qajar dynasty.

Islamic Republic of Iran (1979-Present)
The 1979 Islamic Revolution was equally traumatic for the remaining Zoroastrians, and their numbers reduced drastically. Immediately after the revolution, during Bazargan's premiership, Muslim revolutionaries "walked into the main Zoroastrian fire temple in Tehran and removed the portrait of the Prophet Zoroaster and replaced it with one of [Ayatollah] Khomeini".

However, just like the Armenian, Assyrian and Persian Jewish communities, Zoroastrians are officially recognized and on the grounds of the 1906 Constitution allocated one seat in the Iranian Parliament, currently held by Esfandiar Ekhtiari Kassnavieh. Out-marriage and low birth rates affect the growth of Iran's Zoroastrian population which, according to Iran's 2012 census results, stood at 25,271, though this represented an increase of 27.5% on the 2006 population.

In 2013, Sepanta Niknam was elected to the city council of Yazd and became the first Zoroastrian councillor in Iran.

Persecution by other Zoroastrians

Mazdakism was viewed by the Zoroastrian hierarchy as a heresy and its followers were persecuted by Zoroastrian Sassanian leaders. The Sassanian ruler Khosrau I launched a campaign against the Mazdakis in 524 or 528, culminating in a massacre which killed most of them, including Mazdak himself and restored orthodox Zoroastrianism as the state religion.

Various accounts specify the way of death: e.g. the Shahnameh states that the three thousand Mazdakis were buried alive with the feet upwards in order to present Mazdak with the spectacle of a "human garden", whereas Mazdak himself was hanged upside down and shot with countless arrows; other stories specify other torturous methods of execution. In any case, Anushiravan then proceeded to implement his own far-reaching social and administrative reforms. Mazdakism almost disappeared after the massacre. Later, there were instances in which Zoroastrian clergy were assisted by Muslims against Zoroastrians whom the Zoroastrian clergy considered to be heretics or separatists.

Persecution by Christians
According to Mary Boyce, Zoroastrians living under Christian rule in Asia Minor were noted to have undergone hardship, notably during the long conflict between the Roman Empire and Persia. Christians living in Sassanian-held territory were noted to have destroyed many fire-temples and Zoroastrian places of worship. Christian priests deliberately extinguished the sacred fire of the Zoroastrians and characterized adherents as "followers of the wicked Zardusht (Zoroaster), serving false gods and the natural elements."

See also

 Parsis of India
 Iranis of India
 Zoroastrianism in Iran
 Qissa-i Sanjan (Story of Sanjan)
 Conversion of non-Islamic places of worship into mosques
 History of Bukhara

References

Bibliography

 
 
 
 
 
 
 
 
 
 
 
 
 
 
 
 
 
 
 
 
 
  
 
 
 
 
 
 
 
 
 
 
 
 
 
 
 
 
 
 
 
 
 
 
 
 
 
 
 
 
 

Forced migration
Anti-Zoroastrianism
Persecution by Muslims